Marki is in Masovian Voivodeship, east-central Poland.

Marki may also refer to:

Places
 Marki, Łódź Voivodeship (central Poland)
 Marki, Podlaskie Voivodeship (north-east Poland)
 Marki, Subcarpathian Voivodeship (south-east Poland)
 Marki, Opole Voivodeship (south-west Poland)
 Marki, Voronezh Oblast, Russia

People
 Marki Bey (born 1947), an American actress
 MarkiLokuras (born 1997), a Spanish YouTuber and content creator
 Dominik Märki (born 1990), a Swiss-American curler
 Ferenc Marki (1912–2008), an internationally known fencing master and coach
 Hansruedi Märki (born 1960), a Swiss former cyclist
 Raphael Märki (born 1992), a Swiss curler
 Traugott Märki, a Swiss footballer

See also
Mark I (disambiguation)